Caipira (Old Tupi:  or kaa-pira, which means "bush cutter") is a Portuguese dialect spoken in the rural areas of the State of São Paulo and adjacent parts of neighbouring Mato Grosso do Sul, Goiás, Minas Gerais, and Paraná.

History
The formation of the caipira dialect began with the arrival of the Portuguese in São Vicente in the sixteenth century. Ongoing research points to several influences, such as Galician-Portuguese, represented in some archaic aspects of the dialect, and the língua geral paulista, a Tupian Portuguese-like creole codified by the Jesuits. The westward colonial expansion by the Bandeirantes expedition spread the dialect throughout a dialectal and cultural continuum called Paulistania in the provinces of São Paulo, Mato Grosso (later, Mato Grosso do Sul and Rondônia), Goiás, Federal District, and Minas Gerais.

In the 1920s, the scholar Amadeu Amaral published a grammar and predicted the imminent death of the Caipira dialect, caused by urbanization and the coming wave of mass immigration resulting from the monoculture of coffee. However, the dialect survived in rural subculture, with music, folk stories (causos), and a substratum in city-dwellers' speech, recorded by folklorists and linguists, although some Caipira variants where already heard by the 1790s to 1890s

Sociolinguistics
Although the caipira accent originated in the state of São Paulo, the middle and upper class sociolect of the state capital is now a very different variety closer to standard Portuguese but with some Italian-influenced elements, and working-class paulistanos may sound somewhat  like caipira to people of other parts of Brazil, such as Bahia and Rio de Janeiro. Caipira is spoken mostly in the countryside

Linguistic bias 
See the dedicated article into sociolinguistic topics

Linguistic bias or preconceito linguistico is a theme that gained relevancy in the discussion of Brazilian Portuguese by Brazilian linguists, perhaps because of the work "Preconceito linguístico: o que é, como se faz" by Marcos Bagno, the same author describes it as a subtype of social bias since according to him, it attacks the people speaking in a specific manner and not the manner itself, Aldo Bizzocchi ,linguist who owns the blog Diário de um linguista (Diary of a linguist) and the YouTube channel Planetalingua (Planet-suffix associated with languages, "The world of languages"), that perceives any sort of bias towards ethic, LGBT, gender identities and biological sexes while understanding it as resource that has the capacity of save lives, as the byproduct of ignorancy says that this discrimination based on dialectal variation can be seen even in some seemingly innocent scenarios like in Brazilian comedy where Caipiras but also Nordestinos (Northeastener (in Brazil)), which are also people with "weird accents" (Nordestino dialect) are always comedic entities

Representation of this level of prestige of Caipira can be seen in Chico Bento, some characters sometimes show some unacceptability towards the manner of speech of the main character, Chico Bento and his father, the achademic paper that is titled Uma analise sociolinguística da linguagem de Chico Bento em alguns quadrinhos de gibi (A sociolinguistic analysis on the speech of Chico Bento in some scenes found in comic books) by Norte Cientifico sees it as a recurrent theme in the series, the abstraction that the way he speaks fits into is usually understood to be "wrong" by institutions like schools and media such as TV, Ads, Books, possibly because linguistics is a less known science

Phonology

There may be some variation between speakers, the following is a description of various features of this dialect that is sometimes described as having a significant number of particularities::

Rhoticism 

The most common coda ar allophones of caipira is not the same of those in urban areas of hinterland São Paulo and some speakers of the capital and the coast, alveolar approximant  and r-colored vowel. Some caipira speakers may use those instead.

Iotization 
The merger of  <lh> into the semivowel ,as in the Northeast dialect Nordestino although unlike it this can't happen for its nasal equivallent and similar to, but not exactly like yeísmo ([] → [ʝ]) is a feature of caipira, some may not merge  into  or may vocalize the <l>. Rarer pronunciations include using approximants for all instances in which European speakers of Portuguese have , including the intervocalic and post-consonantal ones (like in American English) or using a palatal approximant  instead of a rhotic approximant. That, while more common in the caipira area by its particular phonology, is more often associated with speech-language pathology.

Lowering 
The lowering of \i\ to [e] happens in some context in caipira speech, so <país> "country" gets realized as [päes] in caipira speech, this can also happen with diphthongs and semi-vowels, \i j\ become [e] and \w u\ become [o].

Heightening 
This phenoma happens in most dialects although not all (the dialect Curitibano/Sulista does not have this.)

In this dialect it occurs in 'Vocalic Groups' (cães, areas, ... but not diphthongs like mais \aj\, leite \ej\) and in stressed vowels and the result of the heightening is [i] and [u]. Elision often happens in cases where it happens.

Diphthongization before specific consonants 
Certain vowels start to glide to a [j] sound before coda <s> as in other dialects (this merges mas and mais, that difference may be confusing for someone that's why there's a significant amount of material explaining the differences between the too), this may be analyzed as adding a [j], this pronunciation, there are identified cases where this sort of shift happens before <n> in Caipira as in some idiolects of Paulistano, that is the dialect spoken casually in the urban regions of the southeast, this sort of realization was historically registered typically only in other vernaculars but that doesn't mean it doesn't occur in more educated speakers, those that know the standard but may do this in familiar, colloquial or informal registers of language

Elision of consonants 
It frequently happens with \r\ (Example: [pro] → [po]) in specific situations, those aren't the same as what may happen in dialects like Paulistano where final rhotics in infinitives of verbs may get removed, elision sometimes described, more informally in Portuguese as "comendo" (that usually passes the idea of consuming food)  but also with vowels (Example: the first <e> in <cadáveres> and <inspetor> get deleted), there are reported cases of this happening in the 1840s and a vowel before <nh> may not get realized

Epenthesis 
There's the usage of a vowel to break unfrequent consonant clusters as in some dialects, Caipira usually uses [e], but there are dialects that use a sound more like [i] (advogado → adevogado) but there are cases of rhotic epenthesis (debuta → debruta), sometimes it also happens because of hypercorrection, (inclusive → inclusivel), epenthesis also occurs more broadly in Brazilian Portuguese when borrowing a word in certain contexts.

Metathesis and other shifts in order
This process happens in \p f\ + \r\ + \V\ sequences where the rhotic + vowel position invert, that also in other situations like with the postposition <em> (which gets realized as [ni]), the rhotic may go to a different syllable (pedestres → pedrestes). This category of sound together with hypothesis change happens frequently with <r> as noted by the linguist Amaral, it was sometimes found that a sound took what was the place of a similar sound (fétido → fedito).

Shifts in the nasalized property 
Things sometimes gain or lose nasality ([NASAL+]) (ordenou → ordeou & economizar → enconomizar). The addition of nasaling may happen with \i\ and \e\ in initial position on their own. Sometimes word final nasality is found in word final position (contagem → contage), that merges "fala" (3rd person singular) with "falam" (3rd person plural). In some representations like Chico Bento, it can be seen.

Shifts in voice (sometimes voicedness) 
Things may gain voice when in between voiced sounds (precisa → perciza). Even as early as the 1808 there were phenoma like devoicing ([bt] → [pt])

Diphthongs shifting to monothongs 
Unstressd \ow\, \aj\, \ej\, \õw\ and \ẽj\ may lose their semi-vowel, but monothongization is in no way limited to Caipira Portuguese and can be observed in other varieties (that includes Portuguese varieties), the [ow] → [o], which results in the short version of the temporal copula <estou> being \to\ (<tô> or <to>) and not \tow\, the broad range of how much of Portugal is affected by this shift is from half to 2/3 of Portugal, others like \ej\ → [e] and \aj\ → [a] also affect other regions.

Table of variants 

The vowels \o e\ which are close to close-mid vowels (whose exact quality differ) are usually heightened in specific contexts, but sometimes speakers don't heighten thesr

Morphology and syntax

Pronouns 
 The usage of "cê" (happens in some) or "ocê" (which is the one used by Chico Bento) as the informal second person singular pronoun, which derived from "você", the pronoun used in most of Brazil.
 "Tu" never gets used and that includes "tu" that does use the conjugation of "você" instead of its own conjugation (<Tu anda> vs <Tu andas>) like in most of the south and in the slang of the Carioca but unlike most of the northeast.
 "Vós" never gets used and always is replaced with "vocês" or "(o)cês" which happens in all Brazil and most of Portugal.

Inflectional morphology 
Observed inflectional morphology development; some (possibly most) of those are not restricted to the Caipira area, formed through contractions.

Gains:

 Com + a = coa
 De + outra = D'outra
 Para + dentro = padãtu
 Para + art = Pa\Po
 Negation word distingtion: Não  in short replies, and num  for negative phrases
 Pra\Para constracts with Ocê (you)
 P(r) + ose = p(r)ose

Loss:

 Because of nasalation shifts, pairs like 'falam' (3rd person plural)  and 'fala' (2\3rd person singular) merge.

Shift in usage

 As other vernacular varieties, if something already makes clear that you are talking about something in the plural, a caipira-speaker may drop its inflection: standard: essas coisas bonitas  "those beautiful things" (those-PL beautiful-PL thing-PL) \ um monte de livros (a lot\mountain-∅ in this case "lot" of book-PL) ↔ caipira and other venecular dialects: essas coisa bonita  (those-PL beautiful-∅ thing-∅) \ um monte de livro (a lot\mountain-∅ in this case "lot" of book-∅), because the fact that there's a lot of book implies that there's more than one. Sometimes this lack of plurality in specific situations is thought of as being very typical of speakers of Paulistano.

Caipira is the Brazilian dialect by far most influenced by the línguas gerais, which is said to be a recent decreolization of them into a more standard Brazilian Portuguese. Nevertheless, the decreolization was successful, and despite all the differences, a speaker of vernacular Brazilian Portuguese of other regions has no difficulty in understanding caipira at all, but foreigners who learned to deal only with standard lusitanizing Brazilian Portuguese may have as much difficulty with caipira as they would have with other colloquial and vernacular registers of the language.

Lexicon 

The words used are extremely similar to that of other venecular varieties in Brazil (ex: <fugaz> almost always not being used, <industria> shifting in meaning and some combinations like <já que> becoming grammatalized) but there are some expressions that are typically caipira, some of those are:

 Acabar no caritó meaning "to be not married"
 Chamego usually capturing things that are related to romance, but sometimes "noise"
 Boca-de-siri meaning "to be quiet"
 Biboca meaning "a house of a poor person", which is normally mentally associated with (Brazilian) stereotypes of those like being hidden, small, as well as other stereotypical ideas of those, it may also refer to a category of business
 Chorar o defunto meaning "to find death unacceptable", this term is prevalent in rural areas in general and not restricted to the more specific zone that Caipira is spoken in
 Dar cabo a machado meaning "to find problems where there aren't any"
 Emendar os bigodes meaning "doing talking extremely frquently" or more strictly doing this while not considering time
 Fazer renda meaning "waiting" that may exclusively signal "the action of waiting for a long period" like Chá de cadera, sometimes used to say that someone was in a chair and therefore not dancing for an entire party
 Pinguço meaning "drunk"  as in the English sentence he is drunk but not the cup of water was drunk by her, as a result of slight semantic drift targeting this word, Pinguço meaning "drinking alchool in an excessive quantity" like alcoólatra

Orthographical pragmatic systems

There is no standard orthography, and Brazilians are taught only the standard variant when learning Portuguese in schools (among the reasons why the dialect was often thought of as endangered in the course of socio-economic development of the country). A nonstandard orthography intended to convey caipira pronunciation is featured prominently in the popular children's comic book Chico Bento, in which some characters speak in it, the table below shows how it usually represents certain phonological aspects of the speech of the Caipira.

These systems may highlight pragmatic-sociolinguistic expectations not being followed in Caipira, like writing Cockney or any exceedingly venecular speech differently.

Chico Bento 

 (As in most orthographical systems,) the variants used for Portuguese do not consider <y> to be an orthographic vowel (in contrast to English, at times)
 "Orthographic sequence" is a formal term for a string (that can be a substring), its reversal would be it reversed.

See also
 Caipira
 Cafundó
 Brazilian Portuguese
 Portuguese dialects
 Portuguese phonology
 Mineiro
 Carioca

References

Further reading
 Garcia, Rosicleide Rodrigues. Para o estudo da formação e expansão do dialeto caipira em Capivari. São Paulo: USP, 2009.
 Pires, Cornélio . Conversas ao pé do fogo - IMESP, edição fac-similar, 1984.
 Rodrigues, Ada Natal.O Dialeto Caipira na Região de Piracicaba , Editora Ática, 1974.

External links
  "O Dialeto Caipira", by Amadeu Amaral
  "Histórias do Zeca Tira 2 – 'As Pinga'", by Adelmario Sampaio – a sample of the caipira dialect in written form

Brazilian Portuguese